Re Charnley Davies Ltd (No 2) [1990] BCLC 760 is a UK insolvency law case concerning the administration procedure when a company is unable to repay its debts. It held that an administrator would only breach a duty of care (here in selling off property, arguably for too little) if an ordinary, skilled practitioner would have acted differently.

Facts
Charnley Davies Ltd was one of 17 insurance broking companies which collapsed in 1987 and operated out of Leeds, Wakefield and Hull. Creditors of Charnley Davies alleged that the administrator, Mr AJ Richmond, acted with undue haste in selling the business. He sold the business for a total of £50,000, plus £7500 for furniture and equipment, allegedly a grossly undervalued price. The creditors argued that they should have been consulted, because they were in the insurance business. The creditors argued the administrators were in breach of Insolvency Act 1986, section 27 because they had been unfairly prejudiced by the administrator's actions (see now Insolvency Act 1986, Schedule B1, para 74, which uses the phrase ‘unfairly harm’).

Judgment
Millett J held that the administrator had not unfairly prejudiced the creditors, and rejected that the standard of care had been breached. This was, in substance, an action for professional negligence. The administrator owed a duty to a company to obtain a proper price for assets, the same as for anybody with a power to sell property that does not belong to him (such as a mortgagee, as in Cuckmere Brick Co Ltd v Mutual Finance Ltd [1971] Ch 949). He ‘must take reasonable care in choosing the time at which to sell the property. His duty is ‘to take reasonable care to obtain the best price that the circumstances permit, as in Standard Chartered Bank Ltd v Walker [1982] 1 WLR 1410. But that only meant ‘the best prices that circumstances as he reasonably perceives them to be permit. He is not made liable because his perception is wrong, unless it is unreasonable.’ Professional negligence principles did apply to professional insolvency practitioners, which administrators must be. This was to be judged by the standard of ‘an ordinary, skilled practitioner. In order to succeed the claimant must establish that the administrator has made an error which a reasonably skilled and careful insolvency practitioner would not have made.’ Millett J also said the following.

See also

UK insolvency law

Notes

References
L Sealy and S Worthington, Cases and Materials in Company Law (9th edn OUP 2010)
R Goode, Principles of Corporate Insolvency Law (4th edn Sweet & Maxwell 2011)

United Kingdom insolvency case law
High Court of Justice cases
1990 in British law
1990 in case law